This is the complete list of Asian Games medalists in basketball from 1951 to 2018.

Basketball

Men

Women

3x3 basketball

Men

Women

References

 Medalists from previous Asian Games – Men
 Medalists from previous Asian Games – Women

External links
Olympic Council of Asia

Basketball
medalists